The 1965–66 Rugby Football League season was the 71st season of rugby league football. A three-way county championship was also held, with comparative minnows Cumberland against Yorkshire and Lancashire.

Rule change
 The substitutes rule introduced in the previous season changed so that substitutions could be used for any reason, including tactical reasons, although they were still only allowed up to and including half-time.

Season summary
The BBC2 Floodlit Trophy competition was launched in this season with the BBC televising matches on Tuesday nights. The competition was used to trial the four-tackle rule, an experiment in ending the unlimited tackles that had been a by-product from the introduction of the play-the-ball in 1906.

St. Helens finished the regular season as league leaders before winning their fourth Championship when they beat Halifax 35–12 in the play-off final.

The Challenge Cup winners were St. Helens who beat Wigan 21–2 in the final.

The BBC2 Floodlit Trophy winners were Castleford who beat St. Helens 4–0 in the final.

St. Helens won the Lancashire League, and Leeds won the Yorkshire League. Warrington beat Rochdale Hornets 16–5 to win the Lancashire County Cup, and Bradford Northern beat Hunslet 17–8 to win the Yorkshire County Cup.

At the end of the season, Eric Ashton became the first Rugby League player to receive an award from Her Majesty, the Queen. He was awarded the MBE in the Queen's Birthday Honours List.

Championship

Play-offs

Final
The 1966 Championship Final was played between Halifax and St. Helens on Saturday, 28 May 1966 at Station Road Ground before a crowd of 30,634. St Helens won 35–12 with their hat trick-scoring prop forward, Albert Halsall being awarded the Harry Sunderland Trophy as man-of-the-match.

Challenge Cup

St Helens had reached the final by beating Wakefield Trinity 10–0 away on 26 February in round one; Swinton 16–4 at home on 19 March in round two; Hull Kingston Rovers 12–10 at home on 2 April in round three and Dewsbury 12–5 on neutral ground on 16 April in the semi-final.

Wigan had reached the final by beating Halifax 9–4 at home on 26 February in round one; Whitehaven 40–6 at home on 19 March in round two; Bradford Northern 15–6 away on 6 April in round three and Leeds 7–2 in the semi-final at Huddersfield on 23 April.

The Challenge Cup final was played at Wembley Stadium, London on 21 May 1966, in front of a crowd of 98,536. Prime Minister Harold Wilson was introduced to the players before kick-off. St Helens led 9–2 at half time and went on to defeat Wigan 21–2. Saints' scorers were John Mantle (1 try), Tommy Bishop (1 try), Len Killeen (1 try, 5 goals), and Alex Murphy (1 goal). Wigan's scorer was Laurie Gilfedder (1 goal). This was St Helens' third Cup final win in seven final appearances.

References

In-line

General

Sources
1965-66 Rugby Football League season at wigan.rlfans.com
The Challenge Cup at The Rugby Football League website

1965 in English rugby league
1966 in English rugby league
Northern Rugby Football League seasons